Underworld: The Eternal War (also known as Underworld: The Game) is a 2004 top-down shooter video game based on the action film Underworld, which was released in 2003.

Story
The storyline revolves around the eternal war between the vampires and lycans, and as the player, they can choose the side they are teaming with. The players can choose the movie's main character, the vampire Selene, or the lycan Raze and also choose between a selection of other vampires, other Lycans or the hybrid.

The player is tasked with taking to the battlefields where they must accomplish missions, whether protecting someone, killing someone, getting an item from somewhere, or simply attacking everyone. Using different weapons, the player slaughters enemies throughout the action-based gameplay.

Cast

Vampires
Selene
Erica
Julia
Dawn

Lycans
Raze
Zak
Lucyan
Bruce
Kurt

External links
Underworld: The Eternal War at Internet Movie Database
Underworld: The Eternal War at GameFAQs

2004 video games
Dark fantasy video games
Europe-exclusive video games
PlayStation 2-only games
Third-person shooters
Eternal War
Video games about vampires
Video games based on films
Video games developed in the United States
Video games featuring female protagonists
Werewolf video games
Multiplayer and single-player video games
PlayStation 2 games
Sony Pictures video games
Lucky Chicken Games games